Gus Wasson (born March 28, 1974) is an American former stock car racing driver. Gus is the son of Paul and Kathy Wasson. He competed part-time in NASCAR's Busch Series from 1998–2004.

Busch Series Career 
Wasson made his Busch Series debut in 1998, making a one-off start at Atlanta Motor Speedway in the #49 Hoiles Motorsports Chevy. Wasson qualified 17th and despite spinning out early on the 73rd lap, he stayed in that vicinity for the entire race, and he ended the race with an 18th-place finish.

Wasson qualified for five races in 1999. Running the #49 car again, Wasson went out again at Atlanta and did in his season debut as he had in his series debut: finish a solid 18th. Wasson made one other run with the team in 1999, this time coming at Lowe's, where Wasson slid a little to a 25th-place finish. However, the team folded without sponsorship and Wasson moved to the #96 Island Oasis Chevy the other three races. Wasson struggled to find chemistry with this team, only managing a best finish of 31st at Charlotte.

Wasson still, though, had the ride for the full 2000 season. However, Wasson only made three of the first six races, and the team split with Wasson, and it would later dissolve a few months later. Wasson only managed a pair of 33rds and a 35th in his starts, but did earn his best qualifying effort of his career at Bristol.

Wasson only made one start in 2001, pairing with the same Hoiles team he had driven for in 1999. The team, back together for one race, started it at Darlington. Wasson made it in the race at 35th, but struggled and finished in that same position.

Wasson made his lone start in 2002 at Nazareth Speedway, making his first start with ORTEC Racing. He started 42nd, but his day was very short. On the first lap, Wasson crashed and left the race before completing a lap in 43rd position.

Wasson is credited to nine races in 2003, a welcome increase to Wasson after some quiet years. He made three starts with ORTEC. He had a pair of 19th at Bristol and Nashville Superspeedway, as well as a 22nd at Kentucky. The other six came in Davis Motorsports's #70 and #0 Chevys. Wasson's best finish with them was a 29th at Atlanta.

Wasson had his busiest year in NASCAR was in 2004, when he once again split time with ORTEC and Davis Motorsports. For ORTEC, Wasson managed to match his best career finish: 18th in the season opener at Daytona International Raceway. After ORTEC began shutting down after Texas, Wasson moved to the #10 Race Girl Chevy for Davis Motorsports. Sadly for Wasson, many of the first races were to park the car right after starting, though Wasson did begin to run the full races later in the year. Once that happened, Wasson had a best of 22nd at Nashville. His last career start to this point came at Darlington, when he finished 28th. Wasson currently works at Merchants Distributors, Inc. in Hickory, NC.

Motorsports career results

NASCAR
(key) (Bold – Pole position awarded by qualifying time. Italics – Pole position earned by points standings or practice time. * – Most laps led.)

Busch Series

ARCA Bondo/Mar-Hyde Series
(key) (Bold – Pole position awarded by qualifying time. Italics – Pole position earned by points standings or practice time. * – Most laps led.)

External links 
 

1974 births
Living people
NASCAR drivers
American Speed Association drivers
People from Wood County, Ohio
Racing drivers from Ohio
ARCA Menards Series drivers
USAC Silver Crown Series drivers